The 2004 European Women Sevens Championship was the third edition of the European Women's Sevens Championship.

Qualification Tournament
Venue/Date: Prague, 14–15 May 2005 
Bosnia failed to appear and were replaced by Czech Republic II. All results. 
Group A

 Bulgaria 26-7 Israel
 Poland 7-42 Germany
 Lithuania 38-0 Austria
 Germany 45-0 Israel
 Bulgaria 12-5 Austria
 Lithuania 15-7 Poland
 Austria 5-0 Israel
 Lithuania 0-19 Germany
 Poland 7-12 Bulgaria
 Germany 52-0 Austria
 Poland 12-0 Israel
 Lithuania 12-5 Bulgaria
 Poland 19-0 Austria
 Bulgaria 0-28 Germany
 Lithuania 33-0 Israel
Group B

 Czech Republic B 0-10 Malta
 Norway 0-28 Russia
 Czech Republic A 7-19 Hungary
 Russia 43-5 Malta
 Czech Republic B 0-7 Hungary
 Czech Republic A 0-7 Norway
 Hungary 10-0 Malta
 Czech Republic A 0-34 Russia
 Norway 40-0 Czech Republic B
 Russia 47-0 Hungary
 Norway 21-0 Malta
 Czech Republic A 17-0 Czech Republic B
 Norway 7-0 Hungary
 Czech Republic B 0-50 Russia
 Czech Republic A 5-0 Malta

Classification Stages

FIRA Women's European Championship
Venue/Date: Lunel, France, 25–26 June 2005'' Summarised

Pool Stages
POOL A

Portugal 12-12 Belgium
England 54-0 Switzerland
Spain 40-0 Portugal
Belgium 12-0 Switzerland
England 12-7 Spain
Portugal 22-5 Switzerland
Spain 24-0 Belgium
England 28-0 Portugal
Spain 43-0 Switzerland
England 21-0 Belgium
POOL B

Netherlands 28-0 Croatia
Sweden 21-0 Italy
France 12-0 Croatia
Netherlands 19-0 Sweden
France 31-0 Italy
Sweden 21-0 Croatia
Netherlands 7-5 France
Italy 12-5 Croatia
Sweden 7-5 France
Netherlands 35-0 Italy

Classification Stages
Plate Semi-finals
France 22-0 Portugal
Italy 19-7 Belgium
Cup Semi-finals
Spain 28-5 Netherlands
England 49-0 Sweden
9th Place
Croatia 7-5 Switzerland
7th Place
Portugal 35-10 Belgium
5th Place (Plate)
France 33-0 Italy
3rd Place
Netherlands 21-7 Sweden
Cup Final
England 14-0 Spain

References

2005
2005 rugby sevens competitions
sevens
2004–05 in French rugby union
International women's rugby union competitions hosted by France
rugby union